Raúl Prada Alcoreza is a Bolivian philosopher and sociologist, a docent-researcher at the Universidad Mayor de San Andrés, member of the La Paz-based Comuna group of political theorists, and participant in national Bolivia politics. He served as a member of the Bolivian Constituent Assembly of 2006-2007 and as Vice Minister of Strategic Planning in the Ministry of Economy and Finance from February to September 2010. As a public intellectual, he has commented on contemporary Bolivian politics and worked with social movement organizations including CONAMAQ.

Bibliography
Among Prada's publications are the following:
Lo dado y el dato (1986) 
La subversión de la praxis (1988) 
Crítica del discurso metafísico de la economía (1988)
Territorialidad (1998)
Ontología de lo imaginario (1997) 
Pensar es devenir (1999) 
Genealogía del poder (2003) 
Largo octubre (2004)
Horizontes de la Asamblea Constituyente (2006)
Subversiones indígenas (2008)

References

Bolivian philosophers
Living people
Year of birth missing (living people)
Deputy government ministers of Bolivia